The 1973 Wightman Cup was the 45th edition of the annual women's team tennis competition between the United States and Great Britain. It was held at Longwood Cricket Club in Chestnut Hill, Massachusetts in the United States.

References

1973
1973 in women's tennis
1973 in American tennis
1973 in British sport